Fairmont State University is a public university in Fairmont, West Virginia.

History
Fairmont State University’s roots reach back to the formation of public education in the state of West Virginia. The first private normal school in West Virginia was established to train teachers in Fairmont in 1865 by John N. Boyd, the school’s first principal. It was known as the West Virginia Normal School at Fairmont.

On February 27, 1867, it was purchased by the State from the Regency of the West Virginia Normal School (formed as a joint stock company in 1866) and became a branch of the State Normal School of Marshall College. Construction began on a brick building on the northwest corner of Adams and Quincy streets later that year.

From 1867 to 1892 the school was known variously as Fairmont Normal School, the Fairmont Branch of the West Virginia Normal School, the Branch of the West Virginia Normal School at Fairmont, a branch of the West Virginia State Normal School of Marshall College, but most commonly as Fairmont State Normal School (FSNS). By 1892 the designation of "branch" had fallen into disuse by FSNS.

In 1893, the school moved into a new building at Second Street and Fairmont Avenue and, in 1917, to its current location in the building now known as Hardway Hall, in honor of former president Wendell G. Hardway, which sits on a hill overlooking Locust Avenue.

Hardway Hall, originally known as Fairmont Normal School Administration Building, was listed on the National Register of Historic Places in 1994.

In 1923, Fairmont State Normal School first offered a four-year bachelor's degree program in education, making the school a college. It was renamed Fairmont State Teachers College in 1931 and Fairmont State College in 1943. On April 7, 2004, Governor Bob Wise signed legislation changing its name to Fairmont State University.

Today, with an enrollment of 3,800, Fairmont State offers more than 80 baccalaureate degrees in business, computer science, education, engineering and technology, fine arts, liberal arts, national security and intelligence, political science, mathematics, and nursing and allied health administration with graduate programs in architecture, education, teaching, business, and criminal justice.

Community and technical college
In 1974, a community college component was founded. This became independently accredited as Fairmont State Community and Technical College in 2003. In 2006, Fairmont State was given direction by the State of West Virginia to split with the community and technical college, which then became known as Pierpont Community and Technical College. While both institutions still operate on the Fairmont campus, since 2008, they are recognized as independent institutions and offer completely separate degree programs; Pierpont focuses more on technical associate's programs, while Fairmont State's main focus is on baccalaureate degrees and masters programs.

After a March 2021 Memorandum of Understanding, the two schools will become independent of one another whereby Pierpont has transitioned off of the Fairmont campus.

Athletics

Fairmont State's athletic teams, known as the Falcons (alternately as Fighting Falcons, or Lady Falcons for women's teams), compete in the Mountain East Conference (MEC) in National Collegiate Athletic Association (NCAA) Division II and field teams in 17 sports including football, men's and women's basketball, wrestling, women's soccer, women's volleyball, men's and women's golf, acrobatics and tumbling, baseball, softball, men's and women's swimming, men's and women's tennis, and men's and women's cross country.

The Fighting falcons football team finished the 2016 season with a 10–2 record, clinching an NCAA playoff berth. In 2017, they finished the season 8–3 and 2nd in the MEC.

In 2017, the men's basketball team was ranked #3 in the final NABC Coaches Poll. In post-season play, the Falcons captured the NCAA Atlantic Region title and earned the top-seed in the NCAA Elite Eight tournament eventually losing to Northwest Missouri State in the tournament final on March 25, 2017 by a score of 71–61.

Traditions
The Victory Bell

In 1940, the Letterman's Association (now the Fairmont State Athletic Association) presented the college with a "Victory Bell" from a Monongahela oil barge. Nicknamed "Old Boaz" – in honor of Boaz Fleming, the founding father of Fairmont – students would ring the bell after athletic team victories.

During World War II, the Victory Bell was declared silent and was not rung again until Victory in Europe Day (V-E Day) on May 8, 1945. It was rung for that victory and for the Americans still fighting in the South Pacific.

The exact date unknown (likely the late 1960s), the tradition shifted from ringing to painting the bell by various fraternities, sororities, and other campus organizations – its clapper and handle removed.

Originally located adjacent to Hardway Hall, the bell now stands in front of the Education Building.

Honor societies

Alpha Phi Sigma (Criminal Justice)
Alpha Psi Omega (Dramatics) founded at the college in 1925 by professor Paul F. Opp. 
Beta Beta Beta (Biology) 
Delta Sigma Rho (Forensics)
Epsilon Pi Tau (Technology) 
Family & Consumer Science Honor Society
Kappa Delta Pi (Education) 
Kappa Kappa Psi (Band) 
Kappa Pi (Art) 
Nursing Honorary 
Phi Alpha Theta (History) 
Phi Theta Kappa
Pi Gamma Mu (Social Science)
Pi Sigma Alpha (Political Science)
Psi Chi (Psychology) 
Sigma Alpha Iota (Music) 
Sigma Tau Delta (English) 
Society for Collegiate Journalists

Social organizations

Inter-Panhellenic Council 
Inter-Fraternity Council 
Non-Panhellenic Council
Women’s Panhellenic Council
Dutch Simmons Appreciation Club 
Student Graphics Organization
Alpha Eta Rho 
Alpha Phi Alpha
Alpha Sigma Tau
Delta Xi Omicron (local) 
Delta Zeta 
Omega Psi Phi
Sigma Sigma Sigma 
Sigma Pi
Sigma Omega Beta (local)
Phi Sigma Phi
Tau Beta Iota (local)
Tau Kappa Epsilon
Zeta Phi Beta (chartered April 13, 2018)
Student Accountant Society
Model United Nations
Model Arab League
Young Democrats
College Republicans

The National Security Lab
The Open Source Intelligence Exchange (OSIX) organization was created in 2012 and serves as Fairmont State's applied research lab under the National Security and Intelligence program. OSIX uses open source and social media intelligence to determine real-world active threats, including for such events as the 2010 Presidential visit to West Virginia by then-President Obama. Professor David Abruzzino, who came to Fairmont State after retiring from work with the CIA, was the OSIX program director and faculty mentor from 2010 until 2017. Dr. Todd Clark, who formerly worked for the Defense Intelligence Agency (DIA), is the current director of OSIX. Students who work in the OSIX lab utilize open source and social media intelligence tools to monitor potential and active threats, and have worked with agencies like the CIA, FBI, Department of Defense, and Department of State, as well as local and state departments and agencies in West Virginia.

Notable alumni

 Perry Baker, current U.S. international rugby sevens player and two-time World Rugby Sevens Player of the Year
 Wendell R. Beitzel, member of Maryland House of Delegates
 George C. Edwards, member of Maryland State Senate
 Leroy Loggins, American professional basketball player in Australia
 Herbert Morrison, radio reporter whose voice is heard in the footage of the Hindenburg Disaster
 Ira E. Robinson, West Virginia politician and judge, first chairman of the Federal Radio Commission
 Bill Stewart, former head football coach at West Virginia University
 Luke Gallows,  American pro wrestler for WWE

Notable faculty
Ruth Ann Musick, noted folklorist and author

See also
Luella Mundel

References

External links

Fairmont State Athletics website

 
Education in Marion County, West Virginia
Public universities and colleges in West Virginia
Educational institutions established in 1865
Buildings and structures in Marion County, West Virginia
Tourist attractions in Marion County, West Virginia
1865 establishments in West Virginia